Ethiopian Airlines, the national airline of Ethiopia, has a good safety record. , the Aviation Safety Network records 64 accidents/incidents for Ethiopian Airlines that total 459 fatalities since 1965, plus six accidents for Ethiopian Air Lines, the airline's former name. Since , the company wrote off 36 aircraft, including three Boeing 707s, three Boeing 737s, one Boeing 767, two Douglas DC-3s, two Douglas DC-6, one de Havilland Canada DHC-5 Buffalo, two de Havilland Canada DHC-6 Twin Otters, 21 subtypes of the Douglas C-47, one Lockheed L-749 Constellation and one Lockheed L-100 Hercules.

Ethiopian's deadliest incident took place on 10 March 2019, when a Boeing 737 MAX 8, barely four months old, crashed shortly after takeoff en route from Addis Ababa to Nairobi; all 157 people on board perished. Until then, the airline's most infamous accident occurred on 23 , when a hijacked Boeing 767-200ER crashed into the Indian Ocean off the coast of the Comoros Islands due to fuel starvation, killing 125 of the 175 passengers and crew on board. The crash of a Boeing 737-200 at Bahir Dar Airport in  ranks as the carrier fourth-deadliest accident, with 35 fatalities, out of 104 people on board.

Following is a list of accidents and incidents involving Ethiopian Airlines aircraft. It includes hijackings, events involving fatalities and/or events causing damage beyond repair to the aircraft.

List

Notes

References



 
Lists of aviation accidents and incidents